Cerotalis is a genus of beetles in the family Carabidae, containing the following species:

 Cerotalis amabilis Sloane, 1890
 Cerotalis brachypleura Sloane, 1898
 Cerotalis longipes Sloane, 1898
 Cerotalis majuscula (Putzeys, 1868)
 Cerotalis semiviolacea Castelnau, 1867
 Cerotalis substriata Castelnau, 1867
 Cerotalis versicolor Castelnau, 1867

References

Broscini
Taxa named by François-Louis Laporte, comte de Castelnau
Carabidae genera